Gibbula zonata is a species of sea snail, a marine gastropod mollusk in the family Trochidae, the top snails.

Description
The size of the shell varies between 6 mm and 10 mm. The rather solid shell is imperforate but excavated at the place of the umbilicus. It has a depressed-conical shape. It is whitish, with numerous spiral bauds and lines of purplish-brown. The surface is very lightly obliquely striate, closely, densely finely spirally striate, generally with three strong carinae, one at periphery, the others above. The about 5 whorls are convex, those of the upper surface bicarinate. The convex body whorl is carinate or subcarinate. The oblique aperture is rounded-quadrangular. It is nacreous inside with slight sulci at the positions of the external carina. The columella is a little straightened.

Distribution
This species occurs in the Atlantic Ocean off Namibia and the western coast of South Africa; in the Indian Ocean off the Agulhas Bank.

References

 P. Bartsch (1915), Report on the Turton collection of South African marine mollusks, with additional notes on other South African shells contained in the United States National Museum; Bulletin of the United States National Museum v. 91 (1915)
Kilburn, R.N. & Rippey, E. (1982) Sea Shells of Southern Africa. Macmillan South Africa, Johannesburg, xi + 249 pp. page(s): 41

External links
 

zonata
Gastropods described in 1828